The Cleveland mayoral election of 1957 saw the second re-election of Anthony J. Celebrezze.  Mayor Celebrezze again ran unopposed in the general election by virtue of having captured a majority of votes in the primary election, under the laws of the city charter.

General election

References

Mayoral elections in Cleveland
Cleveland mayoral
Cleveland
November 1957 events in the United States
1950s in Cleveland